Ted Carpenter could refer to:

Theodore Carpenter (1898–1975), American jazz musician 
Edmund "Ted" Snow Carpenter (1922–2011), American anthropologist 
Ted Carpenter (politician), American politician from Arizona